SBGS may refer to:

 Lithuanian State Border Guard Service
 State Border Guard Service of Ukraine